Leixões Sport Club is the volleyball team of Leixões Sport Club, based in Matosinhos, Portugal. It plays in Portuguese Volleyball League A1.

Honours
 Portuguese Volleyball League A1: 8
1963–64, 1971–72, 1973–74, 1975–76, 1978–79, 1979–80, 1981–82, 1988–89

 Portuguese Volleyball Cup: 5
1968–69, 1972–73, 1976–77, 1982–83, 1988–89

 Portuguese Volleyball Super Cup: 1
1989

Portuguese volleyball teams
Sport in Matosinhos